South Lake High School is a high school in St. Clair Shores, Michigan in the Metro Detroit area, and serves grades 9-12. It is the only high school in the South Lake Schools district.

Demographics
The demographic breakdown of the 615 students enrolled in 2015-2016 was:
Male - 51.5%
Female - 48.5%
Native American/Alaskan - 0%
Asian/Pacific islanders - 1%
Black - 55%
Hispanic - 1.8%
White - 37.4%
Multiracial - 4.9%

64.1% of the students were eligible for free or reduced-cost lunch.

References

External links

Public high schools in Michigan
Educational institutions established in 1927
Schools in Macomb County, Michigan
1927 establishments in Michigan